The 1996 Super 12 season was the inaugural season of the Super 12, contested by teams from Australia, New Zealand and South Africa. The season ran from February to May 1996, with each team playing all the others once. At the end of the regular season, the top four teams entered the playoff semifinals, with the first placed team playing the fourth and the second placed team playing the third. The winner of each semifinal qualified for the final, which was contested between the Auckland Blues and Natal Sharks, with the Blues winning 45 – 21 to win the first Super 12 title.

This was the first season of professional rugby union in the Southern Hemisphere (the Northern Hemisphere had their first season a few months earlier due to the seasonal differences). The season was also the first of 10 under the deal between SANZAR and News Corporation which gave all broadcasting rights to News Limited for the Super 12, Tri-Nations, all inbound tours and test matches and in Australia, New Zealand and South Africa as well as provincial competition matches. The deal was collectively worth $550,000,000 USD.

The teams from Australia and New Zealand were regional teams, a system that has continued to this day. South Africa used a different system for determining its Super 12 teams. The top four sides from the previous season of the country's domestic competition, the Currie Cup, were granted berths in the Super 12. This system would continue through the 1998 competition; only in 1999 did South Africa adopt the same system used by the other two participating countries.

Table

Points breakdown:
 4 points for a win
 2 points for a draw
 1 bonus point for a loss by seven points or less
 1 bonus point for scoring four or more tries in a match

The playoffs follow a 1 v 4, 2 v 3 system with the highest placed team at home

Regular season

Week 1

Week 2

Week 3

Week 4

Week 5

Week 6

Week 7

Week 8

Week 9

Week 10

Week 11

Finals

Semifinals

Final

Statistics

Top ten points scorers

Top ten try scorers

Attendances

Notes and references

References

Further reading
McIlraith, M. (2005).Ten Years of Super 12, Auckland: Hodder Moa. 

 
1996
 
 
 
1996 rugby union tournaments for clubs